The Show with Vinny (also known as Show with Vinny) was an American hybrid talk show reality television series on MTV. The series premiered on May 2, 2013, at 10:00 pm ET/PT.

Format
The series captures Vinny Guadagnino as he invites various celebrities into his home, located in  Staten Island, New York, to indulge in a home-cooked Italian meal and a candid conversation with Guadagnino's family. Unlike other talk shows, there is no live studio audience, only Guadagnino's family and friends. Guests included on the show are: Mark Wahlberg, Lil Wayne, Ke$ha, Jenny McCarthy, ASAP Rocky, Whitney Cummings, Anthony Mackie, Ciara, Austin Mahone, Brittany Snow, Kat Graham, Redfoo, Iggy Azalea, Perez Hilton, Victoria Justice, The Saturdays, Jenna Marbles, Erica Mena, MGK, Bella Thorne, Mindless Behavior and Tyler The Creator.

Episodes

References

External links
The Show with Vinny at 495 Productions

2010s American reality television series
2013 American television series debuts
2013 American television series endings
2010s American television talk shows
American television spin-offs
English-language television shows
Jersey Shore (TV series)
MTV reality television series
Reality television spin-offs